Edward Peter Pattenden (31 October 1842 – 3 June 1879) was an English cricketer.  Pattenden was a right-handed batsman, though his bowling style is unknown.  He was born at Brighton, Sussex.

Hammond made his first-class debut for Sussex against Yorkshire at Bramall Lane, Sheffield in 1873.  He made three further first-class appearances for Sussex, the last of which came against Hampshire in 1875 at the Green Jackets Ground, Winchester.  He struggled in his four first-class matches, scoring just 6 runs at an average of 1.50, with a high score of 3 not out, while with the ball he bowled a total of 26 wicketless overs.

He died at the town of his birth on 3 June 1879.

References

External links
Edward Pattenden at ESPNcricinfo
Edward Pattenden at CricketArchive

1842 births
1879 deaths
Sportspeople from Brighton
English cricketers
Sussex cricketers